Cornisepta acuminata is a species of sea snail, a marine gastropod mollusk in the family Fissurellidae, the keyhole limpets.

Description
The height of the shell varies between 3 mm and 5 mm.

Distribution
This species occurs in the Atlantic Ocean from Southeast USA to Central Brazil; in the Gulf of Mexico and the Caribbean Sea.

References

 Dall, W. H. 1889. Reports on the results of dredgings, under the supervision of Alexander Agassiz, in the Gulf of Mexico (1877–78) and in the Caribbean Sea (1879–80), by the U. S. Coast Survey Steamer 'Blake,'. Bulletin of the Museum of Comparative Zoology 18: 1–492, pls. 10–40.

External links
 

Fissurellidae
Gastropods described in 1883